Şıxlar (also, Shikhlar and Shykhlyar) is a village and municipality in the Yardymli Rayon of Azerbaijan.  It has a population of 507 people.

References 

Populated places in Yardimli District